NGC 471  is a lenticular galaxy located about 168 million light-years away from Earth in the constellation Pisces. It was discovered by the German astronomer Albert Marth on November 3, 1864.

See also  
 NGC 7007
 Lenticular galaxy 
 NGC 7302
 List of NGC objects (1–1000)

References

External links 
 

Lenticular galaxies
Pisces (constellation)
0471
861
4793
Astronomical objects discovered in 1864